Stung Treng Airport  is an airport serving Stung Treng, the capital of Stung Treng Province in Cambodia. The Airport was closed in 2003, but there's a helipad that is still in use today.

Facilities

References

External links
 

Airports in Cambodia
Buildings and structures in Stung Treng province